This article documents the aid given by several countries to the people who suffered due to the Russo-Georgian War.

On August 10, Russian Prime Minister Vladimir Putin promised to spend at least 10 billion rubles to help South Ossetia.

On August 10, Russia said it had sent 120 tons of food to South Ossetia. On the same day, Russia's Emergency Situation Minister Sergey Shoygu said that Russia would send a humanitarian aid convoy with 200 tons of food, 16 tons of medical supplies, six electricity generators and water filters, from Russia's North Ossetian capital of Vladikavkaz to Tskhinvali.

On August 11, the Russian government allocated $200 million in urgent aid for South Ossetia, to tackle the growing humanitarian catastrophe, according to Russia's envoy to NATO.

On August 12, the Romanian Supreme Council of National Defense decided to send humanitarian aid to Georgia, consisting of drugs and medical equipment. Spain announced it would contribute €0.5 million in aid and was working with the Red Cross to help refugees. A cargo of humanitarian aid of medical items to the value of 20,000 lats was sent to Georgia from Latvia; the Government also allocated 100,000 lats from contingency resources to assist Georgia in overcoming the consequences of the war. Estonia sent, in addition to humanitarian aid, computer experts to fend off pro-Russian hackers.

On August 13, United States President George W. Bush said the U.S. would send humanitarian aid to Georgia. On the same day, Czech Republic and its armed forces sent one plane of supplies, mainly blood products. This was the first time Czech Republic provided blood to a foreign state. Australia was preparing a humanitarian aid package for Georgia.

On August 14, Belarus sent 60 tons of humanitarian aid to South Ossetia. Belarus was also ready to host around 3,000 children from South Ossetia.

Reuters reported that supplies were being distributed in the Russian-occupied town of Gori. The United States provided a $1 million grant to the World Food Program for local procurement of food aid.

On August 16, several hundred builders from North Ossetia–Alania were scheduled to arrive to participate in the reconstruction of Tskhinvali.

On August 18, a convoy with humanitarian help from Russia was also sent to Georgian city of Gori.

On August 24, the U.S. Navy Destroyer USS McFaul docked at Georgia's Black Sea port Batumi and commenced delivery of humanitarian supplies.

On August 28, Lithuanian Air Force transport aircraft left for Tbilisi with 5 tons of humanitarian aid. That was the fifth donation Lithuania delivered for Georgia.

References

Russo-Georgian War